The 2016 National Invitation Tournament was a single-elimination tournament of 32 NCAA Division I teams that were not selected to participate in the 2016 NCAA tournament. The annual tournament was played on campus sites for the first three rounds, with the Final Four and championship game being held at Madison Square Garden in New York City. The tournament began on Tuesday, March 15 and ended on Thursday, March 31.  An experimental rule allowing players six personal fouls instead of five was approved for use in all national postseason tournaments except for the NCAA Tournament.  The NIT Selection Show aired at 8:30 PM EDT on Sunday, March 13, 2016 on ESPNU. George Washington were the champions over Valparaiso 76–60. The Colonials victory was their first-ever NIT title.

Participants

Automatic qualifiers
The following 15 teams earned automatic berths into the 2016 NIT field by virtue of having won their respective conference's regular season championship but failing to win their conference tournaments or receive an at-large NCAA bid.

At-large bids
The following 17 teams were also awarded NIT berths.

Seeds
The first four teams left out of the NCAA tournament were the top seeds in the four regions, as in last year's tournament. They were St. Bonaventure, South Carolina, Monmouth and Valparaiso.

Schedule
The NIT began on Tuesday March 15. The first three rounds were played on campus sites. The Final Four began on Tuesday, March 29 at Madison Square Garden in New York City, and ended there with the championship game on Thursday, March 31.

Bracket
^Florida was not able to host home games at the O'Connell Center due to arena renovations.

* Denotes overtime period

Media
ESPN, Inc. had exclusive television rights to all NIT games. It will telecast every game across ESPN, ESPN2, ESPNU, and ESPN3 (ESPNews was used for the Valparaiso-Florida State game). Since 2011, Westwood One had exclusive radio rights to the semifinals and championship. In 2016 Scott Graham and Kelly Tripucka provided the call.

See also
 2016 Women's National Invitation Tournament
 2016 NCAA Division I men's basketball tournament
 2016 NCAA Division II men's basketball tournament
 2016 NCAA Division III men's basketball tournament
 2016 NCAA Division I women's basketball tournament
 2016 NCAA Division II women's basketball tournament
 2016 NCAA Division III women's basketball tournament
 2016 NAIA Division I men's basketball tournament
 2016 NAIA Division II men's basketball tournament
 2016 NAIA Division I women's basketball tournament
 2016 NAIA Division II women's basketball tournament
 2016 College Basketball Invitational
 2016 CollegeInsider.com Postseason Tournament

References

National Invitation
National Invitation Tournament
2010s in Manhattan
National Invitation Tournament
Basketball in New York City
College sports in New York City
Madison Square Garden
National Invitation Tournament
National Invitation Tournament
Sports competitions in New York City
Sports in Manhattan